Coronal rain is a phenomenon that occurs in the Sun's corona when hot plasma cools and condenses in strong magnetic fields and falls to the photosphere. It is usually associated with active regions.

References

Further reading
July 2012: Coronal Rain
The Sun's Coronal Rain Puzzle Solved : Discovery News

Solar phenomena
Articles containing video clips